Alette is a commune in the Pas-de-Calais department in northern France.

Geography
A small village situated some 5 miles(3 km) northeast of Montreuil-sur-Mer, on the D151 road.

Population

Sights
 The church. When constructed, in the 12th century, the tower consisted of four triple windows separated by small bays. It was severely damaged in 1544 and it was necessary to reconstruct three of the sides without windows. The spire dates from 1585. The tower is classified as an historic monument.

See also
Communes of the Pas-de-Calais department

References

Communes of Pas-de-Calais